Karl-Heinz Mrosko (11 October 1946 – 18 March 2019) was a German footballer who played as a midfielder for Stuttgarter Kickers, Bayern Munich, 1. FC Nürnberg, Hannover 96, 1860 Munich and Arminia Hannover. He also had a brief spell in the North American Soccer League with Oakland Stompers.

References

External links

1946 births
2019 deaths
People from Lindau
Sportspeople from Swabia (Bavaria)
German footballers
Association football midfielders
Association football forwards
Bundesliga players
2. Bundesliga players
North American Soccer League (1968–1984) players
Stuttgarter Kickers players
FC Bayern Munich footballers
1. FC Nürnberg players
Hannover 96 players
TSV 1860 Munich players
Oakland Stompers players
German football managers
TSV Havelse managers
German expatriate footballers
German expatriate sportspeople in the United States
Expatriate soccer players in the United States
Footballers from Bavaria